Minchina Ota is a 2008 Kannada film directed by A. M. R. Ramesh. It stars Vijay Raghavendra, Sri Murali and Lakshmi Rai in the lead roles. The music was composed by V. Manohar and background score by Dharma Vish. The film released on 10 July 2008. The film is inspired by the 1971 film, Duel.

Plot

The movie deals with Bhadra (Sriimurali) living in a slum, His group has rivalry with another group headed by Vijay (Vijay Raghavendra), a middle class guy, they both love a city girl (Raai Laxmi), their rivalry intensifies with the girl choosing Bhadra over Vijay. How things get on from there is the story.

Cast 
Vijay Raghavendra as Vijay
Sriimurali as Bhadra
Raai Laxmi as girl from the city.
Rangayana Raghu
Umashree
Suman
Rahul Dev
Vinayak Joshi
Sudha Belawadi
Mukhyamantri Chandru
Tennis Krishna

Soundtrack
The music was composed by V. Manohar and released by T-Series.

Reception 
A critic from Deccan Herald wrote that "The narration is gripping, the chase leaves thriller buffs panting for more, the heroine gets to 'act', but pray, where is the story?" A critic from Rediff.com said that "Minchina Ota, despite competent performances from Vijaya Raghavendra and his brother Sree Murali, tests your patience".

References

External links

2000s Kannada-language films
2008 films
Films directed by A. M. R. Ramesh